Gliophorus psittacinus, commonly known as the parrot toadstool or parrot waxcap, is a colourful member of the genus Gliophorus, found across Northern Europe. It was formerly known as Hygrocybe psittacina, but a molecular phylogenetics study found it to belong in the genus Gliophorus. It had already been placed in Gliophorus, but it had been considered a synonym of Hygrocybe.

Description

The broad adnate gills are greenish with yellow edges and spore print white. The green colouring persists at the stem apex even in old specimens. The spores are white, elliptical, smooth and inamyloid.

Its odour and taste are mild. There are no known chemical tests.

It fruits late summer to autumn (September to November).

Distribution and habitat
Gliophorus psittacinus is widely distributed in grasslands in western Europe, United Kingdom, Iceland, Greenland, the Americas, South Africa, Japan, being found in late summer and autumn. In Europe it is apparently in decline due to the degradation of habitats. Early Australian records of this form have been found to be the similar green toadstools Gliophorus graminicolor or G. viridis on reexamination. Gliophorus psittacinus is known to occur at one site in the Lane Cove River valley near Sydney.

Edibility
Gliophorus psittacinus is generally considered edible, but not worthwhile due to its small size and sliminess. Consumption of over 20 specimens in one sitting can cause gastrointestinal disorders.

References

Edible fungi
Fungi of Europe
Fungi of Asia
Fungi of Africa
Taxa named by Jacob Christian Schäffer
Fungi described in 1774
Fungi of Iceland
Hygrophoraceae